Gilberto Galdino dos Santos (born 20 November 1976), known as Beto, is a Brazilian retired professional footballer who played as a defensive midfielder.

He also held a Portuguese passport due to having spent many years in the country, where he even represented, amongst other teams, Benfica. Over the course of seven seasons, he amassed Primeira Liga totals of 180 games and ten goals.

Club career
Born in Carpina, Pernambuco, Beto started his professional career in 1998, having unassuming stints in Argentina and Uruguay. After five years in Portugal with mid-to-bottom table Primeira Liga clubs F.C. Paços de Ferreira and S.C. Beira-Mar, excelling especially in the latter by scoring a career-best six goals in the 2004–05 season even though the Aveiro side ranked last, he signed a three-year contract with S.L. Benfica in early June 2005.

Despite not being a fans' favourite, Beto was often cast in the first team by manager Ronald Koeman. He appeared in 24 league games in his first year, playing the full 90 minutes in half of those. His greatest moment at the Estádio da Luz happened on 7 December 2005 when they defeated Manchester United 2–1 in Lisbon in a UEFA Champions League group stage fixture, sealing the passage to the round of 16 stage – he scored the decider at the 34th-minute mark, netting from outside the area.

Beto's second campaign in Benfica was less notable: with the departure of Koeman and the arrival of manager Fernando Santos and player Kostas Katsouranis (who played in his position), he was relegated to the substitutes bench, playing only six matches in that condition. Thus, he signed a three-year deal with FC Sion from the Swiss Super League on 11 June 2007.

Beto left Sion on 8 December 2008 and, earlier the following month, joined Greek club Ergotelis F.C. for one year. He left on 8 May 2012, aged nearly 36.

Honours
Benfica
Supertaça Cândido de Oliveira: 2005

References

External links

1976 births
Living people
Sportspeople from Pernambuco
Brazilian footballers
Association football midfielders
San Lorenzo de Almagro footballers
Rampla Juniors players
Primeira Liga players
F.C. Paços de Ferreira players
S.C. Beira-Mar players
S.L. Benfica footballers
Swiss Super League players
FC Sion players
Super League Greece players
Ergotelis F.C. players
Brazilian expatriate footballers
Expatriate footballers in Argentina
Expatriate footballers in Uruguay
Expatriate footballers in Portugal
Expatriate footballers in Switzerland
Expatriate footballers in Greece
Brazilian expatriate sportspeople in Argentina
Brazilian expatriate sportspeople in Uruguay
Brazilian expatriate sportspeople in Portugal
Brazilian expatriate sportspeople in Switzerland
Brazilian expatriate sportspeople in Greece